Benard Kipkorir Ngeno (born 10 August 1996) is a Kenyan long-distance runner. In 2020, he competed in the men's race at the 2020 World Athletics Half Marathon Championships held in Gdynia, Poland.

In 2019, he won the men's race at the Istanbul Half Marathon held in Istanbul, Turkey.

References

External links 
 

Living people
1996 births
Place of birth missing (living people)
Kenyan male long-distance runners